Michael Alan Drake (January 15, 1957 – August 12, 2005) was an American football player and coach. He was a star running back at Western Michigan University in Kalamazoo, Michigan. He served as the head football coach at Western New Mexico University in Silver City, New Mexico from 1984 to 1986.

References

External links
 

1957 births
2005 deaths
American football running backs
Western Michigan Broncos football players
Western New Mexico Mustangs football coaches
Sportspeople from Toledo, Ohio
Players of American football from Ohio